La Matanza de Acentejo is a town near the north coast of Tenerife, Canary Islands, Spain. It is located 10 km east of Puerto de la Cruz, and about 20 km west of the island's capital, Santa Cruz de Tenerife. Its name means "the Slaughter of Acentejo" in Spanish, and refers to the 1494 First Battle of Acentejo, lost by the Spanish.

The population is 8,944 (2013) and the area is 14.11 km². The elevation is 425 m. The TF-5 motorway passes through the municipality. The municipality contains the following settlements:
La Matanza de Acentejo
Guia
Las Breñas
El Caleton
Acentejo
San Antonio
San Cristobal

History
In historic times before the arrival of the Spaniards, Acentejo was part of the menceyato (kingdom) of Taoro.  The first and the second battles of Acentejo took place in 1494.  The Spanish under Alonso Fernández de Lugo suffered a terrible defeat at this first battle, at the place now called La Matanza ("The Slaughter").  It occurred in present-day Barranco de San Antonio, which the Guanches called Farfan.  The second battle resulted in a victory for the Spaniards, in which the town of La Victoria de Acentejo was founded.

Currently under construction is a scale replica of the interior of the Holy Sepulchre in Jerusalem (the place where according to Christian tradition, was taken the body of Jesus Christ after his crucifixion), the replica will be located in the plaza of El Salvador's municipality. In this room is to also place a replica of the Shroud of Turin (Italy).

Historical population

Notable people 
 Antonio de Benavides, governor of Spanish Florida

See also
List of municipalities in Santa Cruz de Tenerife

References

Municipalities in Tenerife